This is a list of notable events in music that took place in the year 1990. 

This year was the peak of cassette sales in the United States, with sales declining year on year since then.

Specific locations
1990 in British music
1990 in Norwegian music

Specific genres
1990 in country music
1990 in heavy metal music
1990 in hip hop music
1990 in Latin music
1990 in jazz

Events

January–March
January 8 – Irish singer Sinéad O'Connor released her famous single "Nothing Compares 2 U" (originally written, composed and performed by Prince) which was a worldwide success, becoming one of the best selling singles in the world in 1990 and topped the charts in many countries including the United States and the United Kingdom.
January 18 – Eric Clapton plays the first of eighteen shows in a three-week span at London's Royal Albert Hall.
January 21 – MTV's Unplugged is broadcast for the first time, on cable television, with British band Squeeze.
February 6
Billy Idol is involved in a serious motorcycle accident, resulting in several broken bones. Idol had been scheduled to have a major role in Oliver Stone's film The Doors, but due to his injuries, the role was reduced almost to a bit part. The role of the T-1000 in Terminator 2: Judgment Day, originally intended for Idol, was recast entirely as a result of the accident.
Bob Marley's birthday is a national holiday in Jamaica for the first time.
February 14 – 50,000 fans watch The Rolling Stones play the first of 10 concerts at Tokyo's Korakuen Dome, the beginning of the Stones' first ever tour of Japan. The group was originally scheduled to perform there in 1973 but a drug conviction prevented Mick Jagger from obtaining a visa at the time.
February 16 – Ike Turner is sentenced to four years in prison for possession of cocaine.
February 21 – The 32nd Annual Grammy Awards are presented in Los Angeles, hosted by Garry Shandling. Bonnie Raitt's Nick of Time wins Album of the Year, while Bette Midler's cover of "Wind Beneath My Wings" wins both Record of the Year and Song of the Year. Milli Vanilli win Best New Artist.
February 24 – The Byrds (Roger McGuinn, Chris Hillman and David Crosby) reunite, for the first time in 25 years, to perform at a Los Angeles tribute to Roy Orbison. The three are joined unexpectedly on stage by Bob Dylan, who sings "Mr. Tambourine Man" with the band.
March 15 – MCA Inc. purchases Geffen Records for over $550 million in stock. Under the agreement, David Geffen will continue to run the record company through an employment contract.
March 16 – Flea and Chad Smith of Red Hot Chili Peppers are arrested and charged for an incident two days earlier at a performance in Daytona Beach during MTV's spring break coverage, in which they allegedly sexually assaulted and verbally abused a female audience member after jumping from the stage. They are released on $2,000 bail.
March 20
Gloria Estefan's tour bus is involved in an accident. Estefan suffers several broken bones in her back.
A riot almost breaks out in downtown Los Angeles when Depeche Mode draw a crowd of 20,000 during an in-store appearance at Wherehouse Entertainment to sign copies of their new album Violator.
March 25 – Mötley Crüe's Tommy Lee is arrested for allegedly exposing his buttocks during a performance in Augusta, Georgia.
March 28 – The Go-Go's reunite to play a benefit concert for the California Environmental Protection Act. They play several more reunion shows later in the year.

April–June
April 4 – Gloria Estefan returns to Miami, Florida after undergoing back surgery following the March 20 accident.
April 5 – Michael Jackson is awarded 'Artist of the Decade' by George H. W. Bush at the White House. 
April 6 – Mötley Crüe's Tommy Lee suffers a mild concussion after falling off of scaffolding above his elevated drum kit during a performance in New Haven, Connecticut.
April 7 – Neil Young, Elton John, Kris Kristofferson, Willie Nelson, John Mellencamp, Guns N' Roses and Jackson Browne perform at Farm Aid IV in Indiana. John dedicates "Candle in the Wind" to AIDS patient Ryan White during his performance. White dies the following day.
April 13 – Madonna starts her controversial Blond Ambition Tour in Tokyo, Japan.
April 16 – A massive tribute concert is held at Wembley Stadium for recently freed anti-apartheid activist Nelson Mandela, who appears in a pre-taped 45-minute speech at the event. Performers include Anita Baker, Tracy Chapman, Peter Gabriel, The Neville Brothers and Neil Young. The event is broadcast to 61 countries around the world.
April 24 – Janet Jackson is honored with a Star on the Hollywood Walk of Fame.
April 25 – Jimi Hendrix's Fender Stratocaster, on which he performed his famous version of the "Star Spangled Banner" at Woodstock, is auctioned off in London for $295,000.
April 27 – Axl Rose marries model Erin Everly, daughter of singer Don Everly, in a Las Vegas ceremony. Divorce papers are filed on May 24, then withdrawn, then filed again in October.
May 5 – The 35th Eurovision Song Contest, held in Vatroslav Lisinski Concert Hall in Zagreb, is won by Italian singer Toto Cutugno for the song "Insieme: 1992", Italy's first victory in the contest since 1964. At 46 years old, Cutugno becomes the oldest winner of the contest to date, a record he holds until 2001.
May 6 – Valery Leontiev show "It seems to me that I have not lived" in the Olympic Stadium.
May 12 – First Prague Spring International Music Festival following the Velvet Revolution: Rafael Kubelík conducts the Czech Philharmonic orchestra in Smetana's Má vlast.
May 18 – The Rolling Stones open their Urban Jungle European tour in Rotterdam, the Netherlands.
May 29
In Canada, Toronto police threaten to arrest Madonna if she performs her simulated masturbation scene during her performance of "Like a Virgin" on her Blond Ambition Tour.  Madonna refuses to change her show, and the police decide not to press charges, later denying that they had ever threatened to do so (a claim refuted by footage captured during the filming of Madonna's 1991 documentary Truth or Dare).
At the Eurovision Young Musicians Competition 1990 finals, held at the Musikverein in Vienna, Austria, pianist Nick van Oosterum of the Netherlands takes first place.
June 10 – Members of rap group 2 Live Crew are arrested and charged with obscenity after a performance in a Hollywood, Florida nightclub..
June 12 – Mariah Carey releases her debut album, which would go on to top the Billboard chart for 11 consecutive weeks.
June 30 – Knebworth 1990, a one-off festival at Knebworth Park, England in support of Nordoff-Robbins Music Therapy. Participating musicians have all been winners of the Silver Clef Award. The acts include headliners Pink Floyd, Genesis, Robert Plant, Elton John, Dire Straits, Status Quo, Eric Clapton and others.

July–September
July 7 – The Three Tenors give their first concert, at the Baths of Caracalla in Rome.
July 14 – Jean Michel Jarre's concert Paris la Defense attracts 2.5 million spectators.
July 21 – Roger Waters and numerous guest stars stage a performance of Pink Floyd's The Wall in Berlin, Germany to commemorate the fall of the Berlin Wall eight months earlier. Scorpions, Cyndi Lauper, Thomas Dolby, Sinéad O'Connor, The Band and Bryan Adams are among the performers.
August 5 – Madonna ends her controversial Blond Ambition Tour in Nice, France. The last date was aired live and broadcast on HBO in United States, and later released as Laser Disc only.
August 13 – Curtis Mayfield is paralyzed from the neck down in an accident at an outdoor concert in Flatbush, Brooklyn, after stage lighting equipment collapses on top of him.
August 19 – Leonard Bernstein conducts his final performance at Tanglewood; he suffers a coughing fit in the middle of one piece which almost brings the concert to a premature end.
August 22 – James MacMillan's symphonic piece The Confession of Isobel Gowdie premieres at The Proms in London.
August 24
A judge rules that heavy metal band Judas Priest is not responsible for the actions of two Nevada youths who shot themselves, one fatally, after listening to the band's music in December 1985.
Irish singer Sinéad O'Connor sparks controversy when she refuses to play a concert at the Garden State Arts Center in New Jersey unless the venue refrains from its tradition of playing a recording of the American national anthem before the performance. O'Connor is heavily criticized and her music is dropped from a number of radio stations as a result.
August 27 – Guitarist Stevie Ray Vaughan is killed in a helicopter crash following a concert at the Alpine Valley Music Theatre in East Troy, Wisconsin. He was 35.
September 4 – Walter Yetnikoff steps down after fifteen years as President of CBS Records.
September 11 – After a decade of performing in the Francophone world, Céline Dion makes her formal English-language debut in the United States with the release of her album Unison.
September 26 – The poorly received Cop Rock premieres on US television; it was TV's only musical police drama.

October–December
October 9 – Leonard Bernstein announces his retirement from the conducting podium; he dies five days later.
October 20 – A Florida jury acquits 2 Live Crew of the obscenity charges stemming from a June 10 performance of their act known for its sexually explicit lyrics.
October 22 – Pearl Jam, then named "Mookie Blaylock", play their first show as a band at the Off Ramp club in Seattle, Washington.
October 27 – Janet Jackson's "Black Cat" reaches number one. It was also the first song to simultaneously peak atop the Billboard Hot 100 and Mainstream Rock chart.
November 6 – Madonna releases her new single, "Justify My Love". The accompanying music video is banned by MTV amid international controversy over its sexually explicit content.
November 21 – The Rolling Stones frontman Mick Jagger finally marries longtime girlfriend Jerry Hall in a traditional Hindu ceremony on the island of Bali, although the wedding's legality is questionable.
November 27 – Amid growing public skepticism towards the artistic integrity of dance-pop duo Milli Vanilli as well as creative differences with frontmen Fab Morvan and Rob Pilatus, music producer Frank Farian admits that Morvan and Pilatus had been lip-synching all of their songs, including hits such as "Girl You Know It's True." In actuality, the tracks were composed and recorded by an ensemble of much older artists. Milli Vanilli's Grammy award for Best New Artist is voided in the ensuing fallout; accounts vary as to whether it was revoked or if Morvan and Pilatus returned it themselves.
December 1 – ABC airs a television special accompanying the Red Hot + Blue benefit album in which contemporary pop performers reinterpret the songs of Cole Porter. The special includes video clips portraying the societal effects of AIDS.
December 3 – Following the banning of her "Justify My Love" music video by MTV, singer Madonna appears on Nightline to defend the video.
December 15 – Rod Stewart marries model Rachel Hunter.
December 31 – The nineteenth annual New Year's Rockin' Eve special airs on ABC, with appearances by The Beach Boys, Bell Biv DeVoe, The Kentucky Headhunters, Nelson, The O'Jays and Sweet Sensation.

Also in 1990
Fall – For the first time, Amy Grant and Gary Chapman hold a night of music at their Franklin, Tennessee Riverstone Farm, for local teenagers. Performers included Rich Mullins, Rick Elias, Charlie Peacock, Wes King and Michael W. Smith. The event becomes known as "The Loft".
Guitarists: Dan Nilsson & Micke Bargstörm, Bassist: Martin Persson & Drummer: Rille Even, all quit Opeth who were the original members of the band. David Isberg, the only remaining original member hires Guitarists: Mikael Åkerfeldt (who applied for a bassist position even when the band already had bassist causing friction but ended up as a guitarist) Andreas Dimeo, Bassist: Nick Döring & Drummer: Anders Nordin.
Studio Fredman is built.
Sons of Kyuss change their name to Kyuss and add new members, except for guitarist Josh Homme.
After a hiatus of 7 years, rock group Styx reform to record a new album and tour without long-time guitarist Tommy Shaw, who was committed to Damn Yankees at the time.
Tapes of the original William Walton score for the 1969 film Battle of Britain are rediscovered, having been lost since the score was abandoned in favour of one by Ron Goodwin.

Bands formed
See Musical groups established in 1990

Bands disbanded
See Musical groups disestablished in 1990

Albums released

January–March

April–June

July–September

October–December

Release date unknown

1234 – Propaganda 
1888 – Death in June/Current 93
1990 – Daniel Johnston
2nd Avenue – Idle Cure
Anam – Clannad
Anonymous Bodies in an Empty Room – Swans
Anonymous Confessions of a Lunatic Friend - Bryan Duncan
The Apprentice – John Martyn
Are You Okay? – Was (Not Was)
As I Came of Age – Sarah Brightman
Bang! – Corey Hart
Banking, Violence and the Inner Life Today – McCarthy
Because It's Christmas – Barry Manilow
Beers, Steers, and Queers – Revolting Cocks
Best of the West Rides Again – Riders in the Sky
Beyond Thee Infinite Beat – Psychic TV
Blood Guts & Pussy – The Dwarves
Blue Pacific – Michael Franks
The Blues Brothers Band Live in Montreux – The Blues Brothers (live)
Bluesiana Triangle - Dr. John
Bonafide – Maxi Priest
Brand New Heavies – Brand New Heavies
Career of Evil: The Metal Years – Blue Öyster Cult
Chain Reaction – John Farnham
Christmas, Like a Lullaby – John Denver (12/90) 
Classic Country Music: A Smithsonian Collection – Various Artists
The Collection – Kenny G 
Concrete Jungle – Sway & King Tech
Dare to Be Different – Tommy Emmanuel
Debacle: The First Decade – Violent Femmes
Erpland – Ozric Tentacles
Everybody Wants to Shag... The Teardrop Explodes – The Teardrop Explodes
Evergreen Everblue – Raffi
Extremities, Dirt & Various Repressed Emotions – Killing Joke
Fakebook – Yo La Tengo
Fist Sized Chunks – Skin Yard
The Flower That Shattered the Stone – John Denver (9/90) 
From a Scream to a Whisper – Lowlife
Garista (re-release) – :zoviet*france:
Ghost – Ghost
Gloryline – Dreams So Real
Greatest Hits 1977–1990 – The Stranglers
Groovy, Laidback and Nasty – Cabaret Voltaire
Heartbeats Accelerating – Kate and Anna McGarrigle
Hell with the Lid Off – MC 900 Ft. Jesus
Here Comes Trouble – Scatterbrain
High Wire – Ernie Isley
Hispanic Causing Panic – Kid Frost (7/10/90)
Holy Soldier – Holy Soldier
Home – Hothouse Flowers  
Horse Opera – Riders in the Sky
The House of Love – The House of Love 
Hot Chocolate Massage – Tiny Lights
Iced Earth – Iced Earth (debut) – Released in Europe only (11/90) 
In Scarlet Storm – David Zaffiro
I've Got That Old Feeling – Alison Krauss
Knock, Breath, Shine – Jacob's Trouble
The Last Temptation of Reid – Lard
Live at the China Club – Dramarama 
Live at the Roxy Club – Sham 69

Lofcaudio – Mastedon
Lost Souls – The Raindogs
Love Is Strange – Kenny Rogers
Lovers Who Wander – The Del-Lords
The Lyrical Strength of One Street Poet – D-Boy Rodriguez
The Massacre – The Exploited
Craig McLachlan & Check 1–2 – Craig McLachlan & Check 1–2
Meet Julie Miller – Julie Miller
Mek We Dweet - Burning Spear
Merci – Florent Pagny
Midnight Radio – Big Head Todd and the Monsters
Motive – Red Box
Neighbourhood Threat – Johnny Crash (debut)
A Night on the Town – Bruce Hornsby and the Range 
Nineteen 90 – Regine Velasquez
Once Dead – Vengeance Rising
Other Voices – Paul Young (6/4/90) 
Oh Suzi Q. – Suzi Quatro
Paintings in My Mind – Tommy Page
Party of One – Nick Lowe
Pentagram – Mezarkabul
Plus Signs – Burton Cummings
Powerhouse – White Heart
Reflections – The Shadows (final studio album)
Return to Samoa – Angry Samoans
Rick Elias and the Confessions – Rick Elias
Round the Outside, Round the Outside – Malcolm McLaren
Sack Full of Silver – Thin White Rope 
Seasons of Love – Mad at the World
Set the Booty Up Right (EP) – Fishbone
Shadow in Dreams – Dennis Rea
Shake Your Soul – Baton Rouge
She Hangs Brightly – Mazzy Star (5/21/90) 
Skellington – Julian Cope
Skywriting – The Field Mice
Slap! – Chumbawamba
Slappy – Green Day
Sons of Kyuss – Kyuss (debut)
Space Bandits – Hawkwind (9/24/90) 
A Spy in the House of Love – The House of Love
Sticks and Stones – The 77s
Stiletto – Lita Ford
Strap It On – Helmet
Sylentiger – Trytan
Taking Drugs to Make Music to Take Drugs To – Spacemen 3
Ten Commandments – Ozzy Osbourne Compilation 
Toy Matinee – Toy Matinee
Turned On – Rollins Band
Unfun – Jawbreaker
Unnatural History – Coil
Untitled album by :$OVIET:FRANCE: – :$OVIET:FRANCE: (re-release)
The Vegetarians of Love – Bob Geldof
Volume 2 – Reagan Youth
Waiting for Cousteau – Jean Michel Jarre
Walkin' in Faith – Angelica
Weapons of our Warfare –  Deliverance
Women in the Room – Zachary Richard
The Wonder – Tom Verlaine
World Power – Snap!
The Youth Are Getting Restless (live) – Bad Brains

Biggest hit singles
The following songs achieved the highest positions in the charts of 1990.

Top 40 chart hit singles

Other chart hit singles

Notable singles

Other notable singles

Charts uk. Top singles   1990

 United States: List of Hot 100 number-one singles of 1990 (U.S.)
 Canada: RPM number-one hits of 1990, RPM number-one albums of 1990

Other significant singles
"Little Fluffy Clouds" – The Orb (Sampling led to legal action.)
Sampling copyright debate continues over the Soho single Hippychick, which uses a sample from How Soon Is Now? by The Smiths.

Published popular music 
 "Keep It Together" w.m. Stephen Bray & Madonna
 "The Simpsons theme song" m. Danny Elfman

Top ten best albums of the year
All albums have been named albums of the year for their hits in the charts.

 Depeche Mode – Violator
 Pixies – Bossanova
 Megadeth – Rust in Peace
 Jane's Addiction – Ritual de lo Habitual
 Cocteau Twins – Heaven Or Las Vegas
 Ride – Nowhere
 Public Enemy – Fear of a Black Planet
 Happy Mondays – Pills 'n' Thrills and Bellyaches
 Sonic Youth – Goo
 The La's – The La's

Classical music
Mario Davidovsky
Biblical Songs for soprano, flute, clarinet, violin, cello, and piano
Concertante for string quartet and orchestra
Thomas Demenga – Solo per due, for cello and orchestra
Lorenzo Ferrero
Cadenza, for clarinet and marimba
Discanto sulla musica sull'acqua di Handel
Four Modern Dances, for small orchestra
Musica per un paesaggio, for small orchestra
Rock my Tango, for piano solo
Henryk Górecki
Good Night, Op. 63, for soprano, alto flute, piano and three tam-tams
Intermezzo, for piano
John Harbison – The Flight into Egypt (cantata)
Chris Harman – Iridescence, for 24 strings
Paul Lansky – Smalltalk
Alvin Lucier – Music for Piano with One or More Snare Drums
Witold Lutosławski – Chantefleurs et chantefables for Soprano and Orchestra 
John McCabe – Flute Concerto
James MacMillan
The Confession of Isobel Gowdie
The Berserking
Meredith Monk – Book Of Days
John Pickard – The Flight of Icarus
Carl Vine – Piano Sonata No. 1
Takashi Yoshimatsu – Symphony No. 1 Kamui-Chikap
John Zorn – The Dead Man

Opera
Gerald Barry – The Intelligence Park
Azio Corghi – Blimunda
Mark Lanz Weiser – Purgatory (chamber opera, based on a play by William Butler Yeats)

Jazz

Musical theater
 Aspects of Love (Andrew Lloyd Webber) – Broadway production opened at the Broadhurst Theatre and ran for 377 performances
 Bran Nue Dae (Jimmy Chi)
 A Change in the Heir – Broadway production opened at the Edison Theatre and closed after only two weeks
 Five Guys Named Moe – London production
 Into the Woods London production opened on September 25 and ran for 197 performances.  Starring Julia McKenzie and Imelda Staunton.
Once on This Island – Broadway production opened at the Booth Theatre and ran for 469 performances
 Shogun –  Broadway production opened at the Marquis Theatre and ran for 72 performances
 Sunday in the Park with George (Stephen Sondheim and James Lapine) – London production
 Truly Blessed –  Broadway production opened at the Longacre Theatre and ran for one month

Musical films
Alissa in Concert
Cry-Baby
Graffiti Bridge
His Highness Abdullah
Thazhvaram

Awards
Country Music Hall of Fame Inductee: Tennessee Ernie Ford
Rock and Roll Hall of Fame Inductees: Hank Ballard, Bobby Darin, The Four Seasons, The Four Tops, The Kinks, The Platters, Simon & Garfunkel and The Who
1990 Country Music Association Awards
Grammy Awards of 1990
Eurovision Song Contest 1990: Toto Cutugno
Luc Ferrari wins the International Koussevitzky Prize for Recordings for his composition Histoire du plaisir et de la désolation
Juno Awards: Best Composer: David Tyson/Christopher Ward
Dalida is posthumously awarded the International Diploma by the "International Star Registry" (USA), three years after her death.
Scottish composer Thomas Wilson is appointed a CBE.
Kumar Sanu wins the Filmfare Best Male Playback Award
Anuradha Paudwal wins the Filmfare Best Female Playback Award
32nd Japan Record Awards

Glenn Gould Prize
Yehudi Menuhin (laureate)

Music festivals
In Australia, the Port Fairy Spring Music Festival is founded by Michael Easton and Len Vorster.

Births
January 9 – Di Genius, Jamaican singer, producer, and dj
January 10 – Nicolas Jaar, Chilean American composer and recording artist, works with FKA Twigs. 
January 14 – Grant Gustin, American actor and singer (Glee) 
January 22 – Logic (musician), American rapper, singer, songwriter, and record producer. 
January 25 – Thomas Berge, Dutch singer
January 28 – Ichiko Aoba, Japanese singer 
January 29 - MacKenzie Porter, Canadian country singer, songwriter, and actress. 
February 1 – Laura Marling, British folk-pop singer-songwriter
February 3 – Sean Kingston, American-Jamaican R&B artist
February 6 - Georgia (musician), English record producer, songwriter, singer, rapper and drummer. 
February 10 – SooYoung, a member of nine-piece Korean pop girl group Girls' Generation
February 16 – The Weeknd, Canadian singer, songwriter, rapper, producer (Selena Gomez, Bella Hadid) 
February 18 – Choi Sung-Bong, Korean singer
February 28 - Olivia Jean, American  singer, songwriter, and multi-instrumentalist. (She is known as the lead singer and guitarist of the all-female "garage goth" rock band, the Black Belles)
March 9 – YG (rapper), American rapper
March 13 – Klô Pelgag, Canadian singer from quebec
March 17 
 Hozier (musician), Irish singer-songwriter and musician
 Kai (Canadian singer), Canadian singer-songwriter (Flume)
March 20 – Tessa Violet, American singer-songwriter, musician, activist and YouTuber
March 21 – Erika de Casier, Portuguese-born Danish singer
March 22 
 Claire Huangci, American pianist
 Lisa Mitchell, English-born Australian singer-songwriter
March 26 – Xiumin, South Korean singer (EXO)
March 27 – Kimbra, New Zealand singer-songwriter/guitarist
April 2 – Roscoe Dash, American rapper
April 8 – Jonghyun, South Korean singer-songwriter, record producer and actor { Shinee } (D. 2017)
April 10 – Maren Morris, American country music singer, songwriter, and record producer
April 20 – Luhan, Chinese singer-songwriter
April 21 – Nadya Dorofeeva, Ukrainian singer
April 22 – Machine Gun Kelly (rapper), American rapper, singer, musician and actor (Megan Fox)
 April 24 - Carly Pearce,  American country music singer and songwriter
April 29 – Loick Essien, British singer
May 12
Etika, American youtuber and Twitch streamer who's career started as a rapper (D. 2019) 
Shungudzo, a Zimbabwean-American singer, songwriter, former gymnast, and reality television personality.
May 14 - Sasha Spielberg], American actress and singer known by her stage name of Buzzy Lee. 
May 17 - I_o (musician), American electronic dance music DJ and record producer. (D. 2020) 
May 26 – Nadia Oh, English singer, producer rapper, songwriter and model
May 27 - Chris Colfer, American singer, author and actor 
May 30 
 YoonA, South Korean singer and actress, member of Girls' Generation
 Phillipa Soo, American actress and singer.
June 4 – Zac Farro, American musician, drummer, singer-songwriter and multi instrumentalist (Hayley Williams, Paramore)
 June 5 – DJ Mustard, American producer, DJ, 
June 6 
Raisa Andriana, Indonesian singer
Mike G, American rapper (Odd Future)
June 7 – Iggy Azalea, Australian rapper
June 14 – Starrah,  American songwriter, singer and rapper
June 16 – John Newman (singer), English musician, singer, songwriter and record producer
June 18 – Raleigh Ritchie, English actor, singer-songwriter, rapper, and record producer  
June 19 
 Jason Dy, Filipino singer
 Moses Sumney, American singer-songwriter, musician
June 20 – Iselin Solheim, Norwegian singer and songwriter
June 23 - Sasami,  American singer-songwriter and musician. 
June 25 
 Makj, American dj
June 29 – Laura Macrì, Sicilian-Italian soprano singer (Mayan (band)) 
July 4 – Fredo Santana, American rapper (d.2018)
July 6 – Meg Mac, Australian singer-songwriter and musician
July 10 – Talay Riley, British singer-songwriter, producer
July 12 – Maverick Sabre, British singer-songwriter
July 15 – Olly Alexander, English singer-songwriter, musician, producer
July 16 
 James Maslow, American actor, singer (Big Time Rush)
 Paula Rojo, Spanish singer and songwriter. 
 Wizkid, Nigerian singer 
July 19 – GFOTY, British EDM Pop singer with PC music
July 23 – Dagny (singer), Norwegian pop singer
July 24 
 Ben McKenzie, Australian Idol contestant, singer, actor
 Jay McGuiness, British singer, songwriter and dancer, former member of The Wanted 
July 28 – Soulja Boy, American rapper
July 29 - Kat Dahlia  Cuban-American R&B Latin Pop rapper, singer-songwriter and recording artist. 
August 13
Shila Amzah, Malaysian singer
Serrini - Hong Kong singer
August 15 
 Jennifer Lawrence, American singer/actress
 BloodPop – American musician, record producer, and songwriter (Worked with Britney Spears, Ariana Grande, Madonna, Lady Gaga)
August 16 – Rina Sawayama, Japanese-British singer-songwriter and model.
 August 18 - Tommy Genesis, Canadian rapper, model and artist
August 21 – Bo Burnham, American comedian and musician
August 23 – A.G. Cook, British singer-songwriter, music producer and head of record label PC Music. (Charli XCX)
August 30 – Julia Jacklin, Australian singer-songwriter and musician
September 3 – IZA, Brazilian singer-songwriter
September 4 – James Bay (singer), English singer-songwriter and guitarist
September 6 - DPR Ian, Australian singer
September 9 - Haley Reinhart, American singer and songwriter
 September 11 – Alex Cameron, Australian musician
September 18 – Sam Perry (looping artist), Australian singer-songwriter and looping artist 
September 19 – Bjarki, Icelandic electronic music composer
September 20 – Phillip Phillips, American jazz singer-songwriter, guitarist and sometime actor
September 21 – Phoebe Ryan, American singer-songwriter
September 22 - Sorcha Richardson, Irish singer-songwriter
September 27 – Mitski,  Japanese-American singer-songwriter and musician
October 1 – Charlie McDonnell, English singer-songwriter and guitarist (Chameleon Circuit)
October 2 - Samantha Barks, A Manx singer and actress 
October 4 – Saki, Japanese guitarist and songwriter (Mary's Blood)
October 5 - Taylour Paige, American singer and dancer
October 7 – Seinabo Sey, Swedish recording artist and songwriter
October 11 – Behzod Abduraimov, Uzbek classical pianist
October 20 - Andrew Watt (record producer), American record producer, singer, musician, and songwriter (Miley Cyrus, Camilla Cabello, 5 Seconds Of Summer, Charlotte Lawrence)
October 23 – Stan Walker, Australian-New Zealand singer-songwriter, activist, actor and television personality
October 31 – JID, American rapper and songwriter
November 2 – Kendall Schmidt, American actor, singer (Big Time Rush, Hilary Duff)
November 6 – Kris Wu, Chinese singer-songwriter
November 7 – Matt Corby, Australian singer-songwriter
November 8 – SZA (singer), American singer/songwriter
November 18 
Jackie Thomas, New Zealand singer
Myk Perez, Filipino singer
November 21 - Ricardo Andrés "Ricky" Reglero Rodríguez, member of  Mau y Ricky,  a Venezuelan Latin pop and reggaeton duo and sons of  Argentine-Venezuelan singer Ricardo Montaner 
November 26 
 Rita Ora, British singer
 Chip, British rapper
 tofubeats, Japanese singer, producer and DJ
November 27 – blackbear, American rapper, producer, singer
December 11 – Hyolyn, Korean singer and dancer
December 20 – JoJo, American singer, songwriter, activist and actress
December 21 – Holiday Sidewinder, Australian singer-songwriter, musician and record producer
December 23 – Anna Maria Perez de Tagle, American singer and actress (Demi Lovato)
December 26
Jon Bellion, American singer-songwriter, rapper, record producer.
Illenium, American DJ and record producer
December 28 – David Archuleta, Season 7 American Idol runner-up
December 29 - Nightbirde, American singer-songwriter (d. 2022)
Unknown: Danny L Harle, British music producer and composer  (PC Music)
 Virgen Maria,  Spanish DJ and record producer.

Deaths
January 3 – Arthur Gold, American pianist, 72
January 7 – Jimmy Van Heusen, composer and songwriter, 77
January 18 – Melanie Appleby of British duo Mel and Kim, 23 (liver cancer)
January 19 – Semprini, pianist and broadcaster, 81
January 28 – Puma Jones, American singer, 36 (breast cancer)
January 23 – Allen Collins, Lynyrd Skynyrd guitarist, 37 (complications from pneumonia)
February 1 – Peter Racine Fricker, composer, 69
February 2 – Mel Lewis, drummer and bandleader, 60 (cancer)
February 8 – Del Shannon, singer-songwriter, 55 (suicide by shotgun)
February 14 – Tony Holiday, German singer, 38 (AIDS-related illness)
February 15 – George Suranovich, drummer (Love, Eric Burdon, Chuck Berry), 45 (heart attack)
February 16 - Keith Haring, iconic graffiti artists and AIDS activist
February 24 – Johnnie Ray, singer, 63 (liver failure)
February 26 – Cornell Gunter, R&B singer, 53 (gunshot wound)
March 6 – Mala, singer, 50
March 11 – Muriel Dickson, operatic soprano, 86
March 16 – Andrew Wood, singer (Mother Love Bone), 24 (heroin overdose)
March 17 – Ric Grech, bassist (Family, Blind Faith), 43 (brain haemorrhage)
April 3 – Sarah Vaughan, American jazz singer, 66 (lung cancer)
April 25 – Dexter Gordon, jazz saxophonist, 67
May 1 – Sergio Franchi, Italian-American tenor/actor, 64 (brain cancer)
May 8 – Luigi Nono, composer, 66
May 16 – Sammy Davis, Jr., American entertainer, 64
June 3 – Stiv Bators, punk musician, 40 (concussion)
June 5 – Richard Sohl, pianist (Patti Smith Group), 37 (heart failure)
June 6 – Joe Loss, English bandleader, 80
June 14 – Erna Berger, operatic soprano, 89
June 15 – Jim Hodder, Steely Dan drummer, 42 (drowning)
June 16 – Dame Eva Turner, operatic soprano, 98
June 21
June Christy, American singer, 64 (renal failure)
Elizabeth Harwood, operatic soprano, 52 (cancer)
June 22 – Kripp Johnson, American singer (The Del-Vikings), 54
June 25 – Peggy Glanville-Hicks, composer, 77
July 2 – Snooky Lanson, American singer, 76
July 7 – Cazuza, singer and composer, 32 (AIDS-related)
July 15 – Trouble T Roy, hip-hop dancer, 22 (fall from stage)
July 16 – Sidney Torch, pianist, cinema organist, conductor, orchestral arranger and composer
July 18 – Gerry Boulet, Canadian singer-songwriter (Offenbach), 44 (colon cancer)
July 26 – Brent Mydland, keyboardist (Grateful Dead), 37 (drug overdose)
August 3 – M. Ranga Rao, Indian film composer and music director
August 14 – Lafayette Leake, blues and jazz pianist, organist, vocalist and composer, 71
August 15 – Viktor Tsoi, Russian singer of Kino, 28 (car accident)
August 15 – Ingrid Lang-Fagerström, Swedish harpist, 92
August 17 – Pearl Bailey, singer, 72
August 27 – Stevie Ray Vaughan, American blues guitarist performer, 35 (helicopter crash)
September 2 – Sari Biro, pianist, 78
September 6 – Tom Fogerty (Creedence Clearwater Revival), 48 (AIDS-related)
September 13 – Phil Napoleon, jazz trumpeter, 89
October 3 – Eleanor Steber, operatic soprano, 76
October 4 – Ray Stephens, a onetime member of The Village People, 35
October 6
Asser Fagerström, pianist, composer and actor, 78
Danny Rodriguez, Christian rap artist, 22 (shot)
October 8 – B. J. Wilson, drummer of Procol Harum, 43 (pneumonia after three years in a coma)
October 14 – Leonard Bernstein, American composer and conductor, 72 (pneumonia and a pleural tumor)
October 16
Art Blakey, jazz drummer, 71
Jorge Bolet, pianist, 75
October 27 – Xavier Cugat, violinist, bandleader and arranger, 90
October 31 – M. L. Vasanthakumari, Carnatic musician and playback singer, 62
November 3 – Mary Martin, US singer and actress, 76
November 10 – Ronnie Dyson, soul singer and actor
December 2 – Aaron Copland, American composer
December 7 – Dee Clark, singer, 52 (heart attack)
December 18 – Paul Tortelier, cellist, 76

See also
 1990 in music (UK)
 Record labels established in 1990
 Timeline of musical events

References

 
20th century in music
Music by year